The Bundesvision Song Contest 2006 was the second edition of the annual Bundesvision Song Contest musical event. The contest was held on 9 February 2006 at the Mittelhessen-Arena in Wetzlar, Hesse, following Juli's win in the 2005 contest in North Rhine-Westphalia with the song "Geile Zeit". The contest was hosted by Stefan Raab, Janin Reinhardt, and Elton in the green room.

The winner of the Bundesvision Song Contest 2006 was the band Seeed with the song "Ding", representing Berlin. In second place were Revolverheld representing Bremen, and third place to In Extremo representing Thuringia.

14 of the 16 states awarded themselves the maximum of 12 points, with Saxony, and North Rhine-Westphalia, awarding themselves 10, and 5 points each respectively.

The contest was broadcast by ProSieben and watched by 2.48 million people (9.1% market share). In the 14-49 age range 2.14 million viewers watched the show (18.3% market share).


Results

Scoreboard

References

External links
 Official BSC website at tvtotal.de

2006
Bundesvision Song Contest
2006 song contests